Khadra and the Southern Sinbad (transliterated as Khadra wa Sindibad el khebli) is an Egyptian musical comedy drama film released on December 2, 1952. The film is directed and written by El-Sayed Ziada, features a screenplay co-written with his brother Mahrous, and stars Kamal el-Shennawi, Doria Ahmed, Mahmoud el-Meliguy, Mahmoud Shokoko, and Hassan Fayek. The central character, Mohsen, becomes mentally ill when he learns of his daughter's death from his estate manager, Zaki. Zaki gets in trouble when he sees Khadra and kidnaps her, erroneously thinking her to be his long-lost cousin and Mohsen's daughter.

Cast
 Kamal el-Shennawi (Fouad Bey)
 Doria Ahmed (Khadra)
 Mahmoud el-Meliguy (Zaki Bey, Mohsen Bey's nephew)
 Mahmoud Shokoko (al-Fahlawi)
 Hassan Fayek (tribal Sinbad)
 Zouzou Shakib (Fifi, Zaki's friend)
 Abbas Fares (Mohsen Bey, a madman)
 Reyad el-Kasabgy (Abu Hadwa)
 Ali al-Kassar (Bashir's uncle)
 Hassan El Yamany (Nylon)
 Galal Sadiq (Galal, Fifi's brother)
 Safa al-Jamil (Gamil)
 Hussein Ibrahim
 Afaf Shaker (Lola Bey)
 Abdo Youssef
 Mahmoud al-Rashidi
 Hassan Atla
 Ahmed Abo Abeya
 Sami Naasan
 Kamel al-Shabasi
 Wahba Hassaballah
 Dongal (Ajami Abdelrahman)
 Yaqoub Tanios
 Omar el-Gizawy
 Nabaweya Moustafa (dancer)
 Liz and Lyn (dancers)

Synopsis
A wealthy man named Mohsen Bey (Abbas Fares) suffers from mental illness, and his young nephew Zaki Bey (Mahmoud al-Meliguy) secures a court appointment as his uncle's guardian. Zaki treat's Mohsen's staff harshly and threatens to sack them all, so Mohsen's butler al-Fahlawi (Mahmoud Shokoko) hurriedly telegrams the virtuous young Fouad (Kamal el-Shennawi), the business manager for the estate, to bring the fellahin’s rent back quickly to keep it out of Zaki’s clutches. On the train, Fouad meets a peasant girl named Khadra (Doria Ahmed) and her father (Hassan Fayek), the latter an admirer and imitator of Sinbad the Sailor who calls himself the “Southern Sinbad.” Fouad gives Khadra his address in case she needs help in Cairo.

Fouad arrives at Mohsen's house and finds Zaki, who has hired his friend Fifi (Zouzou Shakib) and her brother Galal (Galal Sadiq) to help manage the estate. Fouad introduces Khadra to Mohsen as his daughter “Lula,” who traveled to Brazil a long time before. Zaki hires gangster Abu Hadwa (Reyad el-Kasabgy) to kidnap Khadra but Fouad calls the police and they free her. Khadra encounters many difficult situations impersonating her Brazilian character, but the real Lola Bey (Afaf Shaker) arrives and clears up the misunderstanding.

Songs
The songs include lyrics by El-Sayed Ziada and Fathi Qura with music by Mohamed Ihsan, Ibrahim Hussein, Sami Naasan, Omar el-Gizawy, and Mahmoud al-Sharif.

Ziad Assaf wrote in the 2017 article, “درية أحمد، صوت المرح في الأغنية السينمائية” (“Doria Ahmed, the Voice of Whimsy in Film Music”), in the Jordanian newspaper Al Ra’i that:

Doria Ahmed’s marriage to director El-Sayed Ziada paved the way for her to enter the world of cinema…She starred in the Khadra films…in which her songs were used to dramatic effect…We feel the lightness and joy in her songs, through which she expresses the whimsical nature of her character.

Reception
According to legendary critic Samir Farid in the entertainment ezine Shahrayar Stars:

Actress Doria Ahmed turned out a stellar performance as the character of Kadra…we forget the simple machinations of the plot to lose ourselves in the comic talents of Shokoko, El-Shennawi, Doria Ahmed, and even Omar el-Gizawy and Nabaweya Moustafa in the cotton harvest dance…The film features a screenplay by Mahrous Ziada…is directed by El-Sayed Ziada…and was a domestic success.

In Al-Wafd, Samar Medhat praised singer-actress Ahmed:

Best-known for the movie Khadra and the Southern Sinbad, she gained renown for songs like “Valley of Bliss”; “اه يا بوي آه يا نا” (“Oh, Oh, Boy, Oh, Oh Na”); and “ل يمين ول شمال سنتر فرويد سنتر هاف” (“Right and North of the Centre-half”), a vivid description of a 1950’s association football match.

References

External links
 El Cinema page
 IMDb page
 Dhliz page
 Karohat page
 Letterboxd page

Egyptian musical comedy films
1952 films
Egyptian comedy-drama films